Ashesh Malla (born 1954 in Dhankuta, Nepal) is a playwright, theatre director, Co-founder and Artistic Director of Sarwanam Theatre Group. He is also the pioneer of street theatre in Nepal.

References

External links
https://web.archive.org/web/20100520015953/http://sarwanam.org/ab_members.php

1954 births
Living people
Nepalese dramatists and playwrights
People from Dhankuta District
People from Kathmandu District
Nepalese theatre directors
Sajha Puraskar winners